Land is a monthly peer-reviewed, open access, scientific journal that is published by MDPI. It was established in 2012. The journal explores land use/land change, land management, land system science, and landscape-related issues. The editor-in-chief is Andrew Millington (Flinders University).

Abstracting and indexing
The journal is abstracted and indexed in:

References

External links

Creative Commons Attribution-licensed journals
Publications established in 2012
MDPI academic journals
Monthly journals
English-language journals
Environmental science journals